László Sinkó (18 March 1940 – 31 July 2015) was a Hungarian actor. He appeared in more than 90 films and television shows between 1959 and 2009.

Selected filmography
 Cat City (1986)
 The Conquest (1996)
 1 (2009)

References

External links

1940 births
2015 deaths
Hungarian male film actors
Male actors from Budapest